Sadalas II (Ancient Greek: Σαδάλας) was a king of the Odrysian kingdom of Thrace from 48 BC to 42 BC. He was the son of Cotys VI.

References

See also 
List of Thracian tribes
 
1st-century BC rulers in Europe
Thracian kings